Biesinger is a surname. Notable people with the surname include:

Thomas Biesinger (1844–1931), German Mormon 
Ulrich Biesinger (1933–2011), German footballer 
Rosemarie Biesinger, German canoeist

See also
Bissinger